Lepidisis is a genus of deep-sea bamboo coral in the family Isididae. It contains the following species:

Species
Lepidisis caryophyllia Verrill, 1883
Lepidisis cyanae Grasshoff, 1986
Lepidisis evalinae Bayer, 1989
Lepidisis inermis Studer, 1894
Lepidisis longiflora Verrill, 1883
Lepidisis macrospiculata (Kükenthal, 1919)
Lepidisis nuda (Wright & Studer, 1889)
Lepidisis olapa Muzik, 1978
Lepidisis rigida (Kükenthal, 1919)
Lepidisis simplex (Verrill, 1883)
Lepidisis solitaria Grant, 1976

References

Isididae
Bioluminescent cnidarians
Octocorallia genera